The Kingdom of Naples was a French client state in southern Italy created in 1806 when the Bourbon Ferdinand IV & VII of Naples and Sicily sided with the Third Coalition against Napoleon and was in return ousted from his kingdom by a French invasion. Joseph Bonaparte, elder brother of Napoleon I, was installed in his stead: Joseph conferred the title "Prince of Naples" to be hereditary to his children and grandchildren. When Joseph became King of Spain in 1808, Napoleon appointed his brother-in-law Joachim Murat to take his place. Murat was later deposed by the Congress of Vienna in 1815 after striking at Austria in the Neapolitan War, in which he was decisively defeated at the Battle of Tolentino.

History 
Although the Napoleonic kings were officially styled King of Naples and Sicily, British domination of the Mediterranean made it impossible for the French to gain control of Sicily, where Ferdinand had fled, and French power was confined to the mainland Kingdom of Naples alone while Ferdinand continued to reside in and rule the Kingdom of Sicily.

In the modernising spirit of the French Revolution, the regimes of Joseph and Murat implemented a programme of sweeping reforms to the organisation and structure of the ancient feudal kingdom. On 2 August 1806, feudalism was abolished, and all the rights and privileges of the nobility suppressed. The practice of tax farming was also ended. The collection of all taxes slowly brought under direct central control as the government brought out the contractors and compensated those who had lost their feudal tax-collecting privileges with bonds. The first public street-lighting system, modelled on that of Paris, was also installed in the city of Naples during Joseph's reign.

Continuing the anti-clerical sentiment of the Revolution, church property was confiscated en masse and auctioned off as biens nationaux (in compensation for the loss of feudal privileges, the nobles received a certificate which could be exchanged for such properties). However, not all church land was sold immediately, with some retained to support charitable and educational foundations. Most monastic orders were also suppressed and their funds transferred to the royal treasury; the Benedictines and Jesuits were dissolved, but Joseph preserved the Franciscans.

In 1808 Joachim Murat, husband of Napoleon's sister Caroline, was granted the crown of Naples by the Emperor after Joseph had reluctantly accepted the throne of Spain. 

Murat joined Napoleon in the disastrous campaign of 1812 and, as Napoleon's downfall unfolded, increasingly sought to save his kingdom. Opening communications with the Austrians and British, Murat signed a treaty with the Austrians on January 11, 1814 in which, in return for renouncing his claims to Sicily and providing military support to the Allies in the war against his former Emperor, Austria would guarantee his continued possession of Naples. Marching his troops north, Murat's Neapolitans joined the Austrians against Napoleon's stepson, Eugène de Beauharnais, Viceroy of the Kingdom of Italy. After initially opening secret communications with Eugène to explore his options of switching sides again, Murat finally committed to the allied side and attacked Piacenza. Upon Napoleon's abdication on 11 April 1814 and Eugène's armistice, Murat returned to Naples. However, his new allies did not trust him, and he became convinced they were about to depose him. 

Upon Napoleon's return in 1815, Murat struck out from Rimini at the Austrian forces in northern Italy in what he considered a pre-emptive attack. The powers at the Congress of Vienna assumed he was in concert with Napoleon, but this was, in fact, the opposite of the truth, as Napoleon was then seeking to secure recognition of his return to France through promises of peace, not war. On 2 April, Murat entered Bologna without a fight. Still, soon he was in headlong retreat as the Austrians crossed the Po at Occhiobello, and his Neapolitan forces disintegrated at the first sign of a skirmish. Murat withdrew to Cesena, then Ancona, then Tolentino. At the Battle of Tolentino on 3 May 1815, the Neapolitan army was swept aside. Though Murat escaped to Naples, his position was irrecoverable, and he soon continued his flight, leaving Naples for France. 

Ferdinand IV & VI was soon restored, and the Napoleonic kingdom came to an end. The Congress of Vienna confirmed Ferdinand in possession of both his ancient kingdoms, Naples and Sicily, but under the new unified title of King of the Two Sicilies, which would survive until 1861.

Army 
The Army of the Kingdom of Naples, active during the French period, or the decade when the Bourbon kingdom was conquered and ruled by the Napoleonids, was an armed land force that took part, alongside the Grande Armée, in many of the major campaigns of the Napoleonic wars. With the Napoleonic occupation and the creation of the new kingdom in 1806, the Neapolitan throne was initially entrusted to Joseph Bonaparte, Napoleon's brother. In 1808, until 1815, the Neapolitan throne was occupied instead by Joachim Murat, one of the most brilliant military commanders of the Napoleonic empire. Following the execution of Murat, this army was not dissolved, but amalgamated with the other army that the Bourbons had kept during their exile in Sicily.

Order of Battle (1815)

State symbols

Sources
Giuliano Procacci, History of the Italian People, London: 1970.
Owen Connelly, Napoleon's Satellite Kingdoms, London: 1965.

Notes

 
Former countries